Paul Troth (born August 19, 1982) is a former college football quarterback and coach. Troth played his high school prep career at Vance High School in Charlotte, North Carolina.  Troth was recruited to play at ECU before transferring to Liberty University.  He later served as an assistant coach at ECU.

Statistics

References

1982 births
Living people
American football quarterbacks
Campbell Fighting Camels football coaches
East Carolina Pirates football coaches
East Carolina Pirates football players
Liberty Flames football players
High school football coaches in North Carolina
High school football coaches in Virginia